Dhheh
PPLI may refer to:
 Professional Programme learning  Institute,
 Payampersa Language Institute, ppli.ir,
 Precise Participant Location and Identification, a Link 16 functional area,
 Private placement life insurance
 Pennsylvania Preparedness Leadership Institute